School Lake is a lake in Le Sueur County, in the U.S. state of Minnesota.

School Lake is so-called because it was located in school section 36.

See also
List of lakes in Minnesota

References

Lakes of Minnesota
Lakes of Le Sueur County, Minnesota